This bibliography of George W. Bush is a list of published works, both books and films, about George W. Bush, the 43rd president of the United States.

By Bush

George W. Bush, A Charge to Keep (1999), 
George W. Bush, We will prevail: President George W. Bush on war, terrorism, and freedom (2003), 
George W. Bush, George W. Bush on God and on Country: The President Speaks Out About Faith, Principle, and Patriotism (2004), 
George W. Bush, Decision Points (2010), 
George W. Bush, 41: A Portrait of My Father (2014), 
 Dietrich, John W. ed. The George W. Bush Foreign Policy Reader: Presidential Speeches with Commentary (Routledge, 2015).

About Bush 

 David Aikman, A Man of Faith : The Spiritual Journey of George W. Bush (2004), 
Eric Alterman and Mark J. Green, The Book on Bush: How George W. (Mis)leads America (2004), 
Ken Auletta (January 19, 2004). Fortress Bush: How the White House Keeps the Press Under Control, The New Yorker, 79#53
 Balmer, Randall. God in the White House: A History – How Faith Shaped the Presidency from John F. Kennedy to George W. Bush (Harper One, 2008).
 Bruce Bartlett, Imposter: How George W. Bush Bankrupted America and Betrayed the Reagan Legacy (2006), 
 Paul Begala, Is Our Children Learning?: The Case Against George W. Bush (2000), 
 Paul Begala, It's Still the Economy, Stupid: George W. Bush, The GOP's CEO (2002), 
 Berry, Michael J. "Controversially executing the law: George W. Bush and the constitutional signing statement." Congress & the Presidency 36#3 (2009).
 John Bonifaz, Warrior King: The Case for Impeaching George Bush (2003), 
 Bostdorff, Denise M. "Epideictic rhetoric in the service of war: George W. Bush on Iraq and the 60th anniversary of the victory over Japan." Communication Monographs 78.3 (2011): 296-323. online
James Bovard, The Bush Betrayal (2004), 
Russell S. Bowen, The Immaculate Deception: The Bush Crime Family Exposed (1991), 
 Brands, Hal. What good is grand strategy?: Power and purpose in American statecraft from Harry S. Truman to George W. Bush (Cornell UP, 2014).
 Brands, Hal, and Peter Feaver. "The case for Bush revisionism: Reevaluating the legacy of America’s 43rd president." Journal of Strategic Studies 41.1-2 (2018): 234-274. online
 
 Robert Bryce, Cronies: Oil, The Bushes, and the Rise of Texas, America's Superstate (2004), 
 Vincent Bugliosi, The Prosecution of George W. Bush for Murder (2008), 
 Burns, Richard Dean. The Missile Defense Systems of George W. Bush: A Critical Assessment (ABC-CLIO, 2010).
 Butterworth, Michael L. "George W. Bush as the 'Man in the Arena': Baseball, Public Memory, and the Rhetorical Redemption of a President." Rhetoric and Public Affairs 22.1 (2019): 1-32 online.
 Robert C. Byrd, Losing America: Confronting a Reckless and Arrogant Presidency (2004), 
 Richard Clarke, Against All Enemies: Inside America's War on Terror (2004), 
 Coe, Kevin. "George W. Bush, television news, and rationales for the Iraq War." Journal of Broadcasting & Electronic Media 55.3 (2011): 307-324 online.
David Corn, The Lies of George W. Bush: Mastering the Politics of Deception (2003), 
 Daalder, Ivo H., and Irving M. Destler. In the Shadow of the Oval Office: Profiles of the National Security Advisers and the Presidents They Served--From JFK to George W. Bush (Simon and Schuster, 2009).
 Ivo H. Daalder and James M. Lindsay, America Unbound: The Bush Revolution in Foreign Policy (2003), 
 Daynes, Byron W., and Glen Sussman, eds. White house politics and the environment: Franklin D. Roosevelt to George W. Bush (Texas A&M University Press, 2010).
John W. Dean, Worse Than Watergate: The Secret Presidency of George W. Bush (2004), 
 Robert S. Devine, Bush Versus the Environment (2004), 
Maureen Dowd, Bushworld: Enter at Your Own Risk (2004), 
 Robert Draper, Dead Certain: The Presidency of George W. Bush (2007), 
 Edwards, Jason A., and Richard Herder. "Melding a new immigration narrative? President George W. Bush and the immigration debate." Howard Journal of Communications 23.1 (2012): 40-65.
 Espinosa, Gastón, ed. Religion and the American Presidency: George Washington to George W. Bush with Commentary and Primary Sources (Columbia UP, 2009).
 Justin A. Frank, Bush on the Couch: Inside the Mind of the President (2004), Regan Books. 
Ben Fritz, Bryan Keefer & Brendan Nyhan, All the President's Spin: George W. Bush, the Media, and the Truth (2004), 
 David Frum, The Right Man: An Inside Account of the Bush White House (2003),  
 Galvin, Daniel J. Presidential Party Building: Dwight D. Eisenhower to George W. Bush (Princeton UP, 2009).
 Gordon, Michael R., and Bernard E. Trainor. The endgame: The inside story of the struggle for Iraq, from George W. Bush to Barack Obama (Pantheon, 2012).
 Green, Michael J. By more than providence: Grand strategy and American power in the Asia Pacific since 1783 (Columbia UP, 2017)  pp 482–517. online
 John Robert Greene. Presidential Profiles: The George W. Bush Years (New York: Facts on File, 2011), ISBN: 978-0-8160-7765-6
 John Robert Greene. The Presidency of George W. Bush (Lawrence: University Press of Kansas, 2021), ISBN: 978-0-7006-3268-8.
James Hatfield, Fortunate Son: George W. Bush and the Making of an American President (1999), 
 Jack Huberman, The Bush-Haters Handbook: A Guide to the Most Appalling Presidency of the Past 100 Years (2003), 
 Molly Ivins, Bushwhacked : Life in George W. Bush's America (2003), 
 Molly Ivins and Lou Dubose, Shrub: The Short but Happy Political Life of George W. Bush (2000), 
 Patrick S. Johnston, Mission Accomplished (2006), 
 William Karel, The World According to Bush (2004) documentary
 Kitty Kelley, The Family: The Real Story of the Bush Dynasty (2004), 
 Kellough, J. Edward, Lloyd G. Nigro, and Gene A. Brewer. "Civil service reform under George W. Bush: Ideology, politics, and public personnel administration." Review of Public Personnel Administration 30.4 (2010): 404-422.
 Kengor, Paul. God and George W. Bush: A Spiritual Life (Regan Books, 2004).
Robert F. Kennedy Jr., Crimes Against Nature: How George W. Bush and His Corporate Pals Are Plundering the Country and Hijacking Our Democracy (2004), 
Ronald Kessler, A Matter Of Character: Inside The White House Of George W. Bush (2004), 
 Brad Koplowitz, Our Brave New World (2010), 
 Kraybill, Jeanine E., And R. A. U. L. Madrid Jr. "The Rhetoric of Crisis: George W. Bush during the Afghanistan and Iraq Wars." American Communication Journal 21.1 (2019) online 
 Kuehl, Rebecca A. "The rhetorical presidency and “accountability” in education reform: Comparing the presidential rhetoric of Ronald Reagan and George W. Bush." Southern Communication Journal 77.4 (2012): 329-348.
 
 Leffler, Melvyn P. "The foreign policies of the George W. Bush administration: Memoirs, history, legacy." Diplomatic History 37.2 (2013): 190-216.
 Michael Lind, Made In Texas: George W. Bush and the Southern Takeover of American Politics (2002), 
 Lindsay, James M. "George W. Bush, Barack Obama and the future of US global leadership." International Affairs 87.4 (2011): 765-779 online.
 
 McClellan, Scott, What Happened: Inside the Bush White House and Washington's Culture of Deception (2009), 
Stephen Mansfield, The Faith of George W. Bush (2003), 
 Anthony Marchionda, Jr., George W. Bush UNBOUND (2012), 
 Mark Crispin Miller, The Bush Dyslexicon: Observations on a National Disorder (2002), 
Mark Crispin Miller, Cruel and Unusual: Bush/Cheney's New World Order (2004), 
 Richard Miniter, Shadow War: The Untold Story of How Bush Is Winning the War on Terror (2004), 
 Bill Minutaglio, First Son: George W. Bush and the Bush Family Dynasty (1999),  -- this work is the first major biography of Bush
 Elizabeth Mitchell, W: Revenge of the Bush Dynasty (2000), 
 Alexander Moens, The Foreign Policy of George W. Bush: Values, Strategy And Loyalty (2004), 
 James C. Moore and Wayne Slater, Bush's Brain: How Karl Rove Made George W. Bush Presidential (2003), 
 Michael Moore, Dude, Where's My Country? (2004), 
 Michael Moore, Stupid White Men (2004), 
 Michael Moore, Fahrenheit 9/11 (2004) motion picture
 Jack Nargundkar, The Bush Diaries: A Citizen's Review of the First Term (2005), 
 Obschonka, Martin, and Christian Fisch. "Entrepreneurial personalities in political leadership." Small Business Economics 50.4 (2018): 851-869.
 Peggy Noonan, We Will Prevail: President George W. Bush on War, Terrorism and Freedom (2004), 
Kevin Phillips, American Dynasty: Aristocracy, Fortune, and the Politics of Deceit in the House of Bush (2004), 
John Podhoretz, Bush Country: How Dubya Became a Great President While Driving Liberals Insane (2004), 
 Carl Pope, Strategic Ignorance : Why the Bush Administration Is Recklessly Destroying a Century of Environmental Progress (2004), 
 B. Wayne Quist and Dr. David F. Drake, Winning the War on Terror: A Triumph of American Values (2005), 
 Gabriel Range, Death of a President (2006) motion picture
 Renshon, Jonathan. “Stability and Change in Belief Systems: The Operational Code of George W. Bush.” Journal of Conflict Resolution 52#6 (2008): 820-849.
 Renshon, Jonathan. “When Public Statements Reveal Private Beliefs: Assessing Operational Codes at a Distance.” Political Psychology 30#4 (2009): 649-661.
 Renshon, Stanley A. In His Father’s Shadow: The Transformations of George W. Bush (Palgrave Macmillan, 2004).
 Renshon, Stanley A. and Jonathan Renshon. “The Theory and Practice of Foreign Policy Decision Making.” Political Psychology 29#4 (2008): 509-532.
 Resh, William G. Rethinking the administrative presidency: Trust, intellectual capital, and appointee-careerist relations in the George W. Bush administration (JHU Press, 2015).
 Rodman, Peter W. Presidential Command: Power, Leadership, and the Making of Foreign Policy from Richard Nixon to George W. Bush (Vintage, 2010).
 Roof, Wade Clark. "American presidential rhetoric from Ronald Reagan to George W. Bush: Another look at civil religion." Social Compass 56.2 (2009): 286-301.
 Saghaye-Biria, Hakime. "Appraising the Foreign Policy Legacy of George W. Bush on Iran: The Roots of the Current Crisis." Journal of Contemporary Research on Islamic Revolution 2.3 (2020): 39-60 online 
 Bill Sammon, Fighting Back: The War on Terrorism from Inside the Bush White House (2002), 
 Bill Sammon, Misunderestimated: The President Battles Terrorism, John Kerry, and the Bush Haters (2004), 
 Michael Scheuer (orig. pub. under "Anonymous"), Imperial Hubris: Why the West is Losing the War on Terror (2004), 
 
 Peter Singer, The President of Good and Evil: The Ethics of George W. Bush (2004), 
 Singh, Robert S. "The Trump, Bush, and Obama Doctrines: A Comparative Analysis." in The Trump Doctrine and the Emerging International System (Palgrave Macmillan, Cham, 2021) pp. 319-353.
 Siracusa, Joseph M., and Laurens J. Visser. "George W. Bush, Diplomacy, and Going to War with Iraq, 2001-2003." The Journal of Diplomatic Research/Diplomasi Araştırmaları Dergisi (2019) 1#1: 1-29 online
 Glenn W Smith, Unfit Commander: Texans for Truth Take on George W. Bush (2004), 
 Jean Edward Smith, Bush (2016), the major scholarly biography 
 W. (2008), a biographical film about George W. Bush. It was produced and directed by Oliver Stone.
 Ron Suskind, The Way of the World (2008).
 Jackson Thoreau, Born to Cheat: How Bush, Cheney, Rove & Co. Broke the Rules - From the Sandlot to the White House  (2007) 
Craig Unger, House of Bush, House of Saud: The Secret Relationship Between the World's Two Most Powerful Dynasties (2004), 
 Von Bothmer, Bernard. Framing the Sixties: The Use and Abuse of a Decade from Ronald Reagan to George W. Bush  (U of Massachusetts Press, 2010).
 Paul Waldman, Fraud: The Strategy Behind the Bush Lies and Why the Media Didn't Tell You (2004), 
 
 
 
 
 
 
 
 Ian Williams, Deserter: George Bush's War on Military Families, Veterans, and His Past (2004), 
 Clint Willis, The I Hate George W. Bush Reader: Why Dubya Is Wrong About Absolutely Everything (2004), 
 Bob Woodward, State of Denial (2006)
 Bob Woodward, Bush At War (2002), 
 Bob Woodward, Plan of Attack (2004), 
 Daniel K. M. Yamashiro, Religious Influences on Crisis Presidential Decision-Making: A New Belief in the Operational Code Analysis of George W. Bush. (Harvard U thesis, 2017) online.

Historiography
 Brands, Hal, and Peter Feaver. "The case for Bush revisionism: Reevaluating the legacy of America’s 43rd president." Journal of Strategic Studies 41.1-2 (2018): 234–274. online

Books about the 2000 election 
 Vincent Bugliosi, The Betrayal of America: How the Supreme Court Undermined the Constitution and Chose Our President (2001), 
 Alan M. Dershowitz, Supreme Injustice: How the High Court Hijacked Election 2000 (2001), 
 H. Gillman, The Votes That Counted: How the Court Decided the 2000 Presidential Election (2001), 
 Ellen Nakashima, The Washington Post, et al., Deadlock: The Inside Story of America's Closest Election (2001), 
 The New York Times, 36 Days: The Complete Chronicle of the 2000 Presidential Election Crisis (2001), 
 David North, The Crisis of American Democracy: The Presidential Elections of 2000 and 2004 (2004), 
 Richard A. Posner, Breaking the Deadlock: The 2000 Election, the Constitution, and the Courts (2001), 
 Jack N. Rakove (ed.), The Unfinished Election of 2000 (2002), 
 Larry J. Sabato, Overtime! The Election 2000 Thriller (2001), 
 Jake Tapper, Down and Dirty: The Plot to Steal the Presidency (2001), 
 Jeffrey Toobin, Too Close to Call: The Thirty-Six-Day Battle to Decide the 2000 Election (2002),

Books about the 2004 election 
 Bob Fitrakis, Did George W. Bush Steal America's 2004 Election? (2005), 
 Steve Freeman and Joel Bleifuss, Was the 2004 Presidential Election Stolen?: Exit Polls, Election Fraud, and the Official Count (2005), 
 Anita Miller, What Went Wrong In Ohio: The Conyers Report On The 2004 Presidential Election (2005), 
 Mark Crispin Miller, Fooled Again (2005),

References 

Bush, George W
Bush, George W.
Political bibliographies
Bibliographies of people
Cultural depictions of George W. Bush
George W. Bush-related lists